Liezel Roux (born 25 May 1967) is a retired South African javelin thrower.

She won the silver medal at the 1992 African Championships, the gold medal at the 1993 African Championships, and the gold medal at the 1999 All-Africa Games.

Her personal best throw is 50.62 metres, achieved in March 2000 in Cape Town.

References

1967 births
Living people
South African female javelin throwers
African Games gold medalists for South Africa
Athletes (track and field) at the 1999 All-Africa Games
African Games medalists in athletics (track and field)